The Kate Shelley 400 was a short-lived streamlined passenger train operated by the Chicago and North Western Railway between Chicago, Illinois and Iowa. The train drew its name from the CNW's popular Twin Cities 400, so-named for making the  run from Chicago to Minneapolis, Minnesota in 400 minutes, and Kate Shelley, a young woman who in 1881 risked her life to save a passenger train from a washed-out bridge. The C&NW introduced the Kate Shelley to fill the void left by the Union Pacific Railroad's famed "City" streamliners, which had moved from the CNW's route to that of the Milwaukee Road. The Kate Shelley made its first run in October 1955. Initially it operated to Boone, Iowa, but this was cut back in 1956 to Cedar Rapids, Iowa, and then again in 1957 to Clinton, Iowa, just across the Mississippi River. The CNW dropped the name altogether on July 23, 1963, though the unnamed trains #1 and #2 continued running until the formation of Amtrak in 1971, when they were discontinued.

References

External links 
 

Passenger trains of the Chicago and North Western Railway
Passenger rail transportation in Iowa
Passenger rail transportation in Illinois
Named passenger trains of the United States
Railway services introduced in 1955
Railway services discontinued in 1963